Davron Austin Cameron (born 8 June 1996 in George, South Africa) is a South African rugby union player, currently playing with the . His regular position is scrum-half, but he can also play as a winger, fullback or a centre.

Rugby career

Youth

In 2014, he played for Eastern Province Country Districts at the premier high schools rugby union competition in South Africa, the Under-18 Craven Week, held in Middelburg.

In 2015, he was among the intake of the Eastern Province Academy. He started two matches for the  team in the 2015 Under-21 Provincial Championship Group A, scoring and converting a try against  in the second of those. He then dropped an age-group to make three appearances as a replacement for the  side, in a season that saw the team go the whole way, winning the 2015 Under-21 Provincial Championship Group A for the first time in their history.

Eastern Province Kings

In 2016, Cameron was one of several youngsters that were included in the  squad that competed in the 2016 Currie Cup qualification series.

References

South African rugby union players
Living people
1996 births
People from George, South Africa
Rugby union scrum-halves
Rugby union centres
Rugby union wings
Rugby union fullbacks
Eastern Province Elephants players
Rugby union players from the Western Cape